The 1996 Giro d'Italia was the 79th edition of the Giro d'Italia, one of cycling's Grand Tours. The Giro began in Athens, Greece, with a flat stage on 18 May, and Stage 11 occurred on 29 May with a stage to Marina di Massa. The race finished in Milan on 9 June.

Stage 1
18 May 1996 — Athens to Athens,

Stage 2
19 May 1996 — Eleusis to Naupactus,

Stage 3
20 May 1996 — Missolonghi to Ioannina,

Rest day
21 May 1996

Stage 4
22 May 1996 — Ostuni to Ostuni,

Stage 5
23 May 1996 — Metaponto to Crotone,

Stage 6
24 May 1996 — Crotone to Catanzaro,

Stage 7
25 May 1996 — Amantea to Massiccio del Sirino,

Stage 8
26 May 1996 — Polla to Naples,

Stage 9
27 May 1996 — Naples to Fiuggi,

Stage 10
28 May 1996 — Arezzo to Prato,

Stage 11
29 May 1996 — Prato to Marina di Massa,

References

1996 Giro d'Italia
Giro d'Italia stages